Goldmine, established in September 1974 by Brian Bukantis out of Fraser, Michigan, is an American magazine that focuses on the collectors' market for records, tapes, CDs, and music-related memorabilia. Each issue features news articles, interviews, discographies, histories, current reviews on recording stars of the past and present. Discographies are included, listing all known releases. Coverage includes rock, blues, soul, Americana, folk, new wave, punk and heavy metal. At one point its chief competitor was DISCoveries (with more of an emphasis on 1950s oldies), which later was purchased by the same owner before folding into it as a single publication.

Goldmine was published bimonthly until 1977, when it became a monthly publication. It recently returned to a bimonthly frequency at the beginning of 2022.  Its headquarters is in New York, NY. Editor: Patrick Prince (2010-2012, 2015-Current). Its writers have included Dave Thompson, Harvey Kubernik, Jeff Tamarkin, Ken Sharp, John Curley, John M. Borack, Chris M. Junior, Colin Escott, Gillian G. Gaar, David Nathan, Steve Roeser, Jay Jay French and Debbie Kruger.

The magazine was produced on newsprint in a tabloid format. It recently had a radical overhaul, complete with more color photography and more interviews. However, the most noticeable change is that the format is a large full-color, glossy magazine, no longer on the old broadsheet. It also has opened a shop for collectors to purchase vinyl records and other music collectibles at Shop.GoldmineMag.com. It is now published by Project M Media.

References

External links

Bimonthly magazines published in the United States
Monthly magazines published in the United States
Music magazines published in the United States
Biweekly magazines published in the United States
Magazines established in 1974
Magazines published in Wisconsin
Project M Group brands